The 1936 New Mexico Lobos football team represented the University of New Mexico as a member of the Border Conference during the 1936 college football season. In their third and final season under head coach Gwinn Henry, the Lobos compiled an overall record of 2–7 record with a mark of 1–4 against conference opponents, finished last out of seven teams in the Border Conference, and were outscored by opponents by a total of 95 to 71.

Schedule

References

New Mexico
New Mexico Lobos football seasons
New Mexico Lobos football